Claud Lester (Deek) Derrick was a Major League Baseball shortstop. He was born on June 11, 1886 in Burton, Georgia. Claud attended college at the University of Georgia. He had 79 career hits in 326 at-bats with one home run and 33 RBI.

He was discovered by Athletics' first baseman and captain Harry Davis in 1909 while playing for the Greenville Spinners in the Carolina Association when Davis and a group of Athletics players were in Greenville.  The following year, Athletics' owner Connie Mack signed him to the Major Leagues from Greenville shortly before the 1910 World Series, which the Athletics won.

Derrick died on July 15, 1974 in Clayton, Georgia.

References

External links

1886 births
1974 deaths
Major League Baseball shortstops
Baseball players from Georgia (U.S. state)
Philadelphia Athletics players
New York Yankees players
Chicago Cubs players
Cincinnati Reds players
Greenville Spinners players
Macon Peaches players
Columbia Gamecocks players
Charleston Sea Gulls players
Knoxville Appalachians players
Baltimore Orioles (IL) players
Louisville Colonels (minor league) players
Indianapolis Indians players
Seattle Rainiers players
Toledo Mud Hens players
People from Rabun County, Georgia